The Bergring Arena is a 18,000-capacity multi-use stadium in Teterow, Germany. It hosts one of the rounds of the Speedway Grand Prix, which is the premier world event in motorcycle speedway.

History
The stadium opened on 18 May 2002 as the Kellerholz Arena and the speedway track has a circumference of 314 metres which cost €270,000 to lay.

On 23 May 2010, the Arena was renamed the Bergring Arena.

The stadium has been used as the venue for the World Championship round known as the Speedway Grand Prix of Germany from 2016 to 2019. In 2020, the Grand Prix did not take place due to the COVID-19 pandemic. However the event made a return for the 2022 Speedway Grand Prix. 

The track record was broken in 2017 by Australian Ty Proctor (59.75 sec) on 22 May 2010 but it was bettered by Matej Žagar who recorded 58.06 sec on 9 September 2017.

See also 
Speedway Grand Prix of Germany

Gallery

References

Buildings and structures in Rostock (district)
Speedway venues in Germany